Haroldo Conti (May 25, 1925 – 1976?) was an Argentine writer, screenwriter, teacher and Latin professor. On May 5, 1976 he disappeared during the Proceso de Reorganización Nacional military dictatorship; on this day the "Día del Escritor Bonaerense" (Day of the Buenos Aires Province writer) is held to commemorate this date of his kidnap.

In 2015, an English translation of his first novel, Southeaster, was published by And Other Stories in the UK.

Biography 

Conti was born in Chacabuco, Buenos Aires.  He was the son of Petronila Lombardi and Pedro Conti, who was the founder of the Chacabuco Peronist party. He studied Philosophy at the University of Buenos Aires, he finished his studies in 1954 and wrote the film La bestia debe morir ("The beast must die").

In 1955 he married Dora Campos and together they had two children: Alejandra and Marcelo. He later formed a home with Marta Acuña (also Scavac) and they had a son together, Ernesto, in early 1976.

Conti discovered the Paraná Delta through his future wife, Dora Campos, who took him boating there before they were married, and came to love the place he would fly over as a qualified civil pilot. They first rented, and later bought a house on one of its islands near Tigre.

The Delta features in "Sudeste" and appears in other of his works. He also gave a hand in the renovation of a boat hull to launch the "Alejandra", which he kept as long as he had the money to sail her. A keen sailor, he was once shipwrecked off the Uruguayan coast in the "Atlantic" yacht.

In 1962 he published his first novel Sudeste (translated as "South-East" - second edition titled "Southeaster"), which won the Fabril Prize and appeared on the Primera Plana best-sellers list in 1963.  In 1964 his book of short stories Todos los veranos ("Every Summer") received the second Premio Municipal.

In 1967 his novel Alrededor de la jaula ("Around the cage") won an award at the Veracruz University in Mexico.

The novel "En vida" [translated as "In Life"], was awarded the Premio Barral in Spain in 1971, Mario Vargas Llosa and Gabriel García Márquez being amongst the jurors.

Between 1967 and 1976 he taught Latin at Liceo Nacional Nº 7 in Buenos Aires. In the early 1970s he travelled to Cuba as a jury member for the Casa de las Américas. He continued to win prizes and awards for his work and in 1975 his final novel Mascaró, el cazador americano ("Mascaró, the American hunter") won the Casa de las Américas Prize.

Conti was warned by a serving officer at the time of the military coup in March 1976 that his name was included on a list of "subversive agents". He was detained with Marta Acuña (who managed to escape with her daughter and Ernesto) at their apartment at Fitz Roy Street 1205, Buenos Aires on May 5, a house that has since been extensively remodelled.

In 1979, the Ministry of Education sent a letter claiming that Conti had retired in order to "carry out various tasks". He is currently included on the list of the permanently disappeared.

Works

Novels
 (1962) Sudeste - (2015) Southeaster (trans. Jon Lindsay Miles). And Other Stories, UK.
 (1966) Alrededor de la jaula
 (1971) En vida (2018) "In Life" (trans. by Jon Lindsay Miles) Immigrant Press, Spain.
 (1975) Mascaró el cazador americano - (2018 republished)

Other
Examinado (1956),unpublished; a one-act play

Short stories
 Todos los veranos (1964)
 Con otra gente (1967) (o Perdido) 
 La balada del álamo Carolina (1975) 
 Las doce a Bragado
 Ad Astra
 Los novios

Legacy 
A number of his works have been made into films including "Crecer de golpe" (1977), based on "Alrededor de la jaula" and "Sudeste" (2003).

In 2002 a telefilm of his story, "Los perfumes de la noche" directed by Santiago Palavecino was broadcast.

His house on the Gambados river was dedicated as a museum to the life of Conti in 2009.

References

External links 
  Biography - timeline
  List of works
  Short bio
  Works

1925 births
1976 deaths
People from Buenos Aires Province
Male screenwriters
Argentine male short story writers
People killed in the Dirty War
Date of death missing
People killed in Operation Condor
20th-century Argentine screenwriters
20th-century Argentine male writers